Żakowski  (with its female form Żakowska  and plural form Żakowscy ) is a Polish surname. It was first recorded in 1391 and is a toponymic derived either from Żakowo or Żakowice, the names of several small Polish villages.
Notable people with the name Żakowski/Zakowski/Zakovsky include:
 Erich Zakowski (born 1934), German master mechanic 
 Jacek Żakowski (born 1957), Polish journalist and author
 Leonid Zakovsky (1894–1938), Soviet politician of Latvian descent
 Peter Zakowski (born 1966), German racing driver
 Sławomir Żakowski (born 1963), Polish brigadier general

References

Polish-language surnames
Polish toponymic surnames